Oleksii Virchenko (born 30 March 2001) is a Ukrainian Paralympic swimmer. He represented the Ukraine at the 2020 Summer Paralympics.

Career
Virchenko represented Ukraine in the men's 100 metre butterfly S13 event at the 2020 Summer Paralympics and won a silver medal.

References

2001 births
Living people
Ukrainian male freestyle swimmers
Sportspeople from Poltava
Paralympic swimmers of Ukraine
Medalists at the World Para Swimming Championships
Medalists at the World Para Swimming European Championships
Paralympic medalists in swimming
Paralympic silver medalists for Ukraine
Swimmers at the 2020 Summer Paralympics
Medalists at the 2020 Summer Paralympics
Ukrainian male butterfly swimmers
Ukrainian male backstroke swimmers
S13-classified Paralympic swimmers
21st-century Ukrainian people